The Women's rhythmic individual all-around  competition at the 2015 Southeast Asian Games was held on 14 June 2015 at the Bishan Sports Hall in Singapore.

Schedule
All times are Singapore Standard Time (UTC+8).

Results

References 

Women's rhythmic individual all-around
Women's sports competitions in Singapore
2015 in women's gymnastics